The Dream 1973-2011 is a jazz vocal boxed set album by Michael Franks, released in 2012 with Warner Music France.

The fifth disc is a re-release of the relatively rare Michael Franks with Crossfire Live album recorded in Australia in 1980.

Track listing

Reception
AllMusic writers rated the original source albums with between two and a half and four stars. The compilation album is available on their online catalogue, but has yet to be rated.

References

Bibliography

Michael Franks (musician) compilation albums
2012 compilation albums
Warner Music France compilation albums